Toyota Central R&D Labs., Inc. (TCRDL) (in Japanese: 豊田中央研究所, Toyota Chuou Kenkyuusho) is the research institute of the Toyota Group. It cooperates with Toyota Group and Toyota Technological Institute (TTI). The facility is located in Nagakute, near Nagoya in Aichi, Japan. The facility was established in November 1960 with a capital of 500 million Yen.  Currently, there are about 1000 employees conducting both fundamental and applied research in a large variety of topics for the Toyota group and other partners.  The current president is Ishikawa, and the current capital is 3 billion yen.

Related Companies

Stockholders
Toyota Industries Corporation
Toyota Motor Corporation
Aichi Steel Corporation
JTEKT Corporation
Toyota Auto Body Co., Ltd
Toyota Tsusho Corporation
Aisin Seiki Co., Ltd
DENSO CORPORATION
Toyota Boshoku Corporation

Technical Cooperation Contracted Companies
Kanto Auto Works, Ltd
Toyoda Gosei Co., Ltd

See also
Toyota Group

External links
Toyota Central R&D Labs., Inc

Laboratories in Japan
Toyota
Research and development organizations
Toyota Group
1960 establishments in Japan